Harmonies poétiques et religieuses (Poetic and Religious Harmonies), S.173, is a cycle of piano pieces written by Franz Liszt at Woronińce (Voronivtsi, the Polish-Ukrainian country estate of Liszt’s mistress Princess Carolyne von Sayn-Wittgenstein) in 1847, and published in 1853. The pieces are inspired by the poetry of Alphonse de Lamartine, as was Liszt’s symphonic poem Les Préludes.

Structure
The ten compositions which make up this cycle are:
 
Invocation (completed at Woronińce);
Ave Maria (transcription of choral piece written in 1846);
Bénédiction de Dieu dans la solitude (‘The Blessing of God in Solitude,’ completed at Woronińce);
Pensée des morts (‘In Memory of the Dead,’ reworked version of earlier individual composition, Harmonies poétiques et religieuses (1834));
Pater Noster (transcription of choral piece written in 1846);
Hymne de l’enfant à son réveil (‘The Awaking Child’s Hymn,’ transcription of choral piece written in 1846);
Funérailles (October 1849) (‘Funeral’);
Miserere, d’après Palestrina (after Palestrina);
 La lampe du temple (Andante lagrimoso);
Cantique d’amour (‘Hymn of Love,’ completed at  Woronińce).

Reception
Critic Patrick Rucker wrote in 2016 that “in Liszt’s engagement with the poetry of Alphonse de Lamartine, there is a naked intensity, an urgent, in-your-face, lapel-grasping earnestness that one doesn’t find, say, in the Années de pèlerinage.”

References

External links 
 
 

Compositions by Franz Liszt
Compositions for solo piano
1847 compositions
Suites (music)